Steven Lee Rubenstein (June 10, 1962 – March 8, 2012) was an American anthropologist. He was reader in Latin American Anthropology at the University of Liverpool, and Director of Liverpool's Research Institute of Latin American Studies.

Beginning in the 1980s, Rubenstein worked with the Shuar people of Ecuador, documenting and analyzing practices of healing, the circulation of shrunken heads, and the ways in which the Shuar reacted to colonization and increasing incorporation into Ecuadorian society. He frequently used life histories of individual Shuar people as a way to understand the political conditions facing the community. He was also known for his application of reflexive and autoethnographic methods when writing about experiences of intimacy and vulnerability in ethnographic fieldwork. In his last work, he used the psychological theory of Jacques Lacan to analyze the ways in which the Shuar use the hallucinogen Ayahuasca.

Rubenstein was the author of Alejandro Tsakimp: A Shuar Healer in the Margins of History (2002), based on his life history interviews with a Shuar shaman, and co-editor with Kathleen S. Fine-Dare of Border Crossings: Transnational Americanist Anthropology (2009). He was also a Wikipedia editor and administrator, under the username Slrubenstein. Since registering his account in December 2001 he made more than 30,000 edits to articles about anthropology and related fields.

Education and career 
Rubenstein was born in Brooklyn, New York, and graduated from The Wheatley School in Old Westbury, New York in 1980. He received BA degrees in anthropology from Columbia University and in philosophy from the Jewish Theological Seminary of America, both in 1984 as part of a joint program, and an MA in anthropology from Columbia in 1986. He obtained his PhD in anthropology in 1995, also from Columbia, where he studied with Michael Taussig, Eric Wolf, Morton Fried, Robert Murphy and Libbet Crandon-Malamud. The title of his thesis was "Death in a Distant Place: The Politics of Shuar Shamans of the Ecuadorian Amazon," based on fieldwork in the Morona-Santiago Province in Ecuador between 1988 and 1992. His approach to studying the indigenous cultures of South America was highly influenced by Taussig's work.

Between 1993 and 1996, Rubenstein taught at the City University of New York, the New York School for Social Research, and Georgetown University, before obtaining a Mellon postdoctoral fellowship at Cornell University's Society for the Humanities (1996–1997). Prior to his appointment as Reader in Latin American Anthropology at the University of Liverpool in 2006, he taught for eight years at Ohio University as assistant then associate professor (1997–2005).

He was actively involved in SALSA, the Society for the Anthropology of Lowland South America, serving on the executive board, as editor of book reviews for its journal, Tipití, and as a conference organizer. In 2008, he was appointed to the editorial board of the journal Cultural Anthropology. In 2008–2009 he was a fellow of the National Humanities Center. SALSA named the Steven Lee Rubenstein memorial Scholarship in his honor.

Selected publications 
Books
with Fine-Dare, Kathleen S. (eds) (2009) Border Crossings: Transnational Americanist Anthropology. University of Nebraska Press.
(2002) Alejandro Tsakimp: A Shuar Healer in the Margins of History.  University of Nebraska Press.

Book chapters
(2009) "Crossing Boundaries with Shrunken Heads", in Fine-Dare and Rubenstein, op. cit.
with Fine-Dare, Kathleen S. (2009) "The Lizard's Dream," in Fine-Dare and Rubenstein, op. cit.
(2006) "A Head for Adventure", in Vivanco, Luis A. and Gordon, Robert A. (eds). Tarzan Was An Eco-Tourist ... and Other Tales in the Anthropology of Adventure. Berghahn Books.

Papers
 (February 2012) 
 (March–June 2008) 
 (2007) 
 (2005) 
 (Summer 2004)  Downloadable copy.
 (2004)  Pdf.
 (June 2004) 
 (2001)  Downloadable copy.
 (2001) 
 (March 1993) 
 (1986)

See also 
 List of Wikipedia people

References

External links 
Rubenstein interviewed about his work with the Shuar, Questions, Questions, BBC Radio 4, January 24, 2011.
"Obituary: Steven Rubenstein", placed in The New York Times, March 16, 2012, www.legacy.com.
  Pdf.

1962 births
2012 deaths
Academics of the University of Liverpool
American anthropologists
Columbia University alumni
Cultural anthropologists
Ohio University faculty
People from Brooklyn
People from Old Westbury, New York
Jewish Theological Seminary of America alumni
Jewish anthropologists
Jewish American social scientists
American Wikimedians
Wikipedia people
The Wheatley School alumni
21st-century American Jews
20th-century American Jews